Kevin McIntyre (born 23 December 1977, Liverpool) is an English retired footballer who played as a midfielder or left-back.

Playing career

Tranmere Rovers & Doncaster Rovers
After failing to establish himself with Tranmere Rovers, McIntyre played in the Football Conference from 1998 to 2004 for Doncaster Rovers (originally on loan, later a permanent deal), Barrow (loan) and Chester City, before the latter's promotion in 2003–04 brought a return for both club and player to Football League circles.

Macclesfield Town

McIntyre was deemed surplus to requirements by Chester, and joined Macclesfield Town in December 2004. He has come back to haunt his former employers by scoring twice in wins against them since, while twice helping Macclesfield avoid relegation out of the Football League on the final day of the season. In May 2007, he signed a fresh two-year deal with the club.

Shrewsbury Town

On 3 January 2008, he joined Shrewsbury Town for a fee of £50,000. On 17 January 2009, he broke his leg in the 1–1 draw away to Port Vale, keeping him out almost until the end of the season. But he played in the last few games of the season and scored a crucial goal in the 1–0 play-off semi-final against Bury. This meant the game went to extra time and a penalty shootout which Shrewsbury won after Luke Daniels had an excellent game meaning the Shrews went to Wembley Stadium for the second time in three seasons.

McIntyre was almost ever-present in the 2009–10 season, and in May 2010 he signed a one-year contract extension. At this point he was the oldest player at the club, celebrating his 33rd birthday midway through the season. He was released by Shrewsbury on 23 May 2011 after 4 years at the club.

Accrington Stanley
He signed for Accrington Stanley on 15 July 2011.

Rochdale
On 2 July 2012, McIntyre signed for Rochdale on a one-year contract after his contract at Accrington Stanley expired.

Chester
In May 2013, McIntyre returned to Chester to sign for phoenix club Chester FC on a one-year deal.

Connah's Quay Nomads
On 24 July 2014, McIntyre joined Welsh Premier League side Connah's Quay Nomads after trialling for the club in pre-season. He later took up a role as player-coach at the club, before retiring in 2016, at the age of 38.

Honours

Club
Doncaster Rovers
Conference League Cup (2): 1998–99, 1999–2000

Chester City
Football Conference (1): 2003–04

References

External links

1977 births
Living people
English footballers
Association football fullbacks
Association football midfielders
Tranmere Rovers F.C. players
Barrow A.F.C. players
Doncaster Rovers F.C. players
Chester City F.C. players
Macclesfield Town F.C. players
Shrewsbury Town F.C. players
Accrington Stanley F.C. players
Rochdale A.F.C. players
Chester F.C. players
Connah's Quay Nomads F.C. players
English Football League players
National League (English football) players
Footballers from Liverpool